Baglioni is an Italian surname. Notable people with the surname include:

Claudio Baglioni (b. 1951), Italian musician
Piero Baglioni (b. 1952), Italian chemist and university professor at the University of Florence
Giovanni Baglione (1566–1643), Italian early Baroque painter and historian of art
Cesare Baglioni (c. 1525–1590), Italian painter of the Renaissance period
Baglioni (family) or one of its members:
Rodolfo Baglioni (1512–1554), Italian condottiero serving in the Imperial army
Astorre Baglioni
Malatesta Baglioni the Elder (died 1437), ruler of Cannara, Spello and Bastia Umbra
Malatesta Baglioni the Younger (1491–1531), ruler of Perugia
Grifonetto Baglioni
Gian Paolo Baglioni (c.1470–1520), condottiero and nemesis of Cesare Borgia

See also
 Baglioni Hotels, an Italian hotel firm with branches in London, Milan and other locations
 Pala Baglioni, an oil painting by Raphael
 Rappaccini's Daughter, a short story by Nathaniel Hawthorne featuring a central character named Baglioni

Italian-language surnames